The discography of the Animals, an English music group of the 1960s formed in Newcastle upon Tyne, contains 20 studio albums, six compilation albums, five EPs and 25 singles. Featuring a gritty, bluesy sound and a deep-voiced frontman in Eric Burdon, they are best known for their rendition of an American folk song named "House of the Rising Sun", which is described by many as their signature song. This single had worldwide sales of nearly 5 million and became a Number One hit in both the UK and US in 1964.  Overall, the group balanced tough, rock-edged pop singles such as "We Gotta Get Out of This Place" and "It's My Life" against rhythm and blues–oriented album material. The Animals released separate UK and US albums, a practice common to other British Invasion bands of the time such as the Beatles and the Rolling Stones.

The Animals underwent numerous personnel changes in the mid-1960s and suffered from poor business management. An incarnation using the name "Eric Burdon and the Animals" moved to California in 1967 and achieved commercial success as a psychedelic rock outfit, before disbanding at the end of the decade. Altogether, the group had ten Top Twenty hits on both the UK charts and US charts.

The original lineup had a brief comeback in 1977 and 1983. There have been several partial regroupings of the original era members since then under various names. The Animals were inducted into the Rock and Roll Hall of Fame in 1994.

Albums 
The Animals official album releases varied significantly between the UK and the US; even those with the same or similar names had different contents. In addition, many compilations and repackaging releases have been issued over the years.

UK Albums

US Albums

Compilation albums

Off-sequence albums 
These albums are principally a continuing re-release of a set of live recordings from Club A Go-Go, Newcastle, 1963, either solely The Animals or The Animals and Sonny Boy Williamson II.  The track listing for the all-Animals set is generally all of or a selection from "Let It Rock", "Gotta Find My Baby", "Bo Diddley", "Almost Grown", "Dimples", "Boom Boom" and "C Jam Blues".  The recordings were made in December, 1963 by Giorgio Gomelsky and involved seven live tracks of the Animals alone and eleven tracks with the Animals backing Sonny Boy Williamson.

The Animals (Capitol [Canada] T-6092, Sep 1964)
Mickie Most Presents 'British Go Go'  (MGM SE-4306, Jan 1965)
Wild Animals (Decca, 1966)
In the Beginning (Wand, 1970) - Live album, recorded 30th December 1963
Rock Generation Vol. 2 (BYG 529.702, 1973) - The Animals at the Club A Go-Go, Newcastle, 1963
Rock Generation Vol. 4 (BYG 529.704, 1973) - more of the same, backing Sonny Boy Williamson
Night Time Is the Right Time (Springboard 4065, 197?) - with Sonny Boy Williamson
Live (Woodford, 1991)
In the Beginning: Live in 1963 (Sundazed, 1993)
Almost Grown (Pazzazz, 2006)
The Animals with Sonny Boy Williamson (Charly, 2006)
Live at the Club A Go-Go (Hallmark, 2008)

Reunion albums

Post-lifetime compilation and reissue albums 
 Best of the Animals (ABKCO 4426, 1973, 2-LP set)
 Best of the Animals (Springboard 4025, 1973)
 Best of the Animals (ABKCO 4324, 1975, 1-LP --- first U.S. compilation to feature the UK "correct" version of "We Gotta Get Out of This Place")
 The Best of the Animals (ABKCO, 1988)
 The Complete Animals (EMI, 1990)
 The Best of Eric Burdon and the Animals 1966–1968 (Polygram, 1991)
 Original Hits (Disky, 1995) 
 The Best of the Animals (EMI, 1997)
 The Best of the Animals (Liberty, 2000)
 The Best of Eric Burdon and the Animals (Universal, 2001)
 Interesting Life (2003)
 Complete French EPs 1964/1967 (2003)
 Retrospective (2004)
 The Hits (2010)

Extended plays

Singles

Non-LP U.S. single B-sides 
 "I'm Going to Change the World" (B-side of "It's My Life")
 "Ain't That So" (B-side of "Monterey")

Explanatory notes 
A.The cover is original Animals lineup that made the recordings.  No identification of recordings as being 1963.  Licensed from Disky Music; Disky ownership interest uncertain.  Five songs only, excluding "Let It Rock" and "C Jam Blues".
B.As described by reviewer Bruce Eder, "Recorded in December of 1963 at a live concert, this CD captures the Animals at their rawest and most animated on record, ripping ferociously through a bunch of standards (by Chuck Berry, James B. Odom, et al.), playing the crowd and making snide comments about their London rivals The Rolling Stones, all with Sonny Boy Williamson II hanging somewhere around the stage. Sundazed has actually found the original master to this oft-bootlegged piece of rock/blues history."
C.The album contains uncredited liner notes describing the early history of The Animals and the December 1963 recording by Giorgio Gomelsky.  There is no indication on cover that the 2006 release is the 1963 live recording.  The cover photo includes Dave Rowberry, who did not join the band until 1965, rather than Alan Price.
D.In fact being the seven live recordings of The Animals without Sonny Boy Williamson.
E.The album includes detailed liner notes by Rob Lipshutz; includes unedited single version of "Monterey", included on an album for the first time.  Previous album inclusions, from the time of The Twain Shall Meet, involved fade-in intro; see Lipshutz liner notes.
F.Eighteen songs from the 1964–1965 period, licensed from EMI.
G.The album of ten tracks, principally 1967–1968 material, featuring the "new" Animals, yet the cover is of the 1963–1965 lineup with Alan Price.  Also includes "Shake" and "All Night Long" from 1966.  No liner notes, production details or recording times.  Contains three actual "hits"—"Monterey", "Sky Pilot" and "San Franciscan Nights".  "Sky Pilot" is the abridged, single version, though not so indicated.

Citations

External links 
 
 
 Eric Burdon discography

Discography
Animals, The
Rock music group discographies